Rothenthurn is a castle in the municipality of Spittal an der Drau in Carinthia, Austria.

History
Once a Carinthian estate of the Counts of Ortenburg and their successors, the Counts of Celje, a "red tower" at the site above the Drava Valley may have existed since the 11th century. A castle is documented in 1478, when the area was held by the Meinhardiner House of Gorizia. The present-day Renaissance building with its chapel was erected from the early 16th onwards, it was acquired by Christoph Khevenhüller about 1525 and afterwards in the possession of several local nobles over the centuries. Today the owners run the castle as a lodging establishment.

See also
List of castles in Austria

References
This article was initially translated from the German Wikipedia.

External links
Hotel website

Castles in Carinthia (state)